Schering is a surname. Notable people with the surname include:
Ernst Christian Friedrich Schering (1824–1889 ), German founder of both Schering AG and Schering-Plough
Ernst Christian Julius Schering (1833–1897), German mathematician
Harald Schering (1880–1959), German physicist
Arnold Schering (1877–1941), German musicologist

German-language surnames